Desacetylmetipranolol is the active metabolite of metipranolol.

References

Beta blockers
Phenols
N-isopropyl-phenoxypropanolamines